Azizabad (also Romanized as ‘Azīzābād; also known as Bīzhanābād-e Soflá) is a village in Nehzatabad Rural District, in the Central District of Rudbar-e Jonubi County, Kerman Province, Iran. At the 2006 census, its population was 124, in 27 families.

References 

Populated places in Rudbar-e Jonubi County